Andrejs Auzāns (1871–1953) was a Latvian general and topographer.

Auzāns was a major general in the Imperial Russian Army, best known for being the commander of the 7th Bauska Rifleman Regiment and the 2nd Rifleman Brigade. He also served as the chief of the Russian General Staff Topographical Section for the Red Army.

Early life 
Andrejs Auzāns was born on April 4, 1872, in Pļaviņu parish, in the Bormaņi homestead. He studied in a parish school in Koknese and Vietalva. In 1893, he graduated from a school in the city of Pskov, Russia as a land surveyor.

Life until the First World War 
After graduating from school, Auzāns enlisted in a military topography school from which he graduated in 1895. He later served as podporuchik (lieutenant) in Finland. Starting in 1896, he was an officer at a topography unit near St. Petersburg.

In 1900, he began his studies in the Russian Academy of General Staff and graduated in 1903 as a captain.
In 1905, he graduated from a practical course in geodesy and astronomy at the Pulkovo observatory and was admitted into the Russian General Staff. He participated in the Russo-Japanese war.
Later, he served as an officer and topographer in Estonia, Finland, Manchuria and Turkmenistan.
In 1907 he was promoted to the rank of podpolkovnik (lieutenant colonel).
From 1907 until 1910 he worked as an astronomer.
In 1911, he was promoted to the rank of colonel.
From 1911 until 1916 he was a director of the Tashkent observatory.

First World War 
When Latvian riflemen units formed in 1915, Auzāns was in Uzbekistan. He returned to Latvia in 1916 and enlisted in a rifleman unit; ultimately becoming the commander of the 7th Bauska Rifleman Regiment. Before the legendary Christmas Battles, Auzāns was appointed as the commander of the 2nd Latvian Rifleman Brigade.
In 1917 he was promoted to the rank of major-general and appointed chief of the Russian General Staff Topographical Section. He served in this post until 1920, after the October Revolution. In 1921, he worked as a lecturer in the Soviet Military Academy.

Life in the Republic of Latvia 
Auzāns returned to Latvia in 1923 and enlisted in the Latvian Army. He was promoted to the rank of general and became a member of the Military Council at the Ministry of War.
In 1927, he became the chief of the topographical section of the Latvian Army Headquarters. Auzāns also worked as a lecturer in the Latvian Military Academy, and was the chief of a Latvian rifleman association. In 1933, he reached the maximum service age and retired. In later years, he published several books about topography and military history.

Last years 
During and after the occupation of Latvia in 1940 Auzāns was not repressed. He did not collaborate with either the Soviet or Nazi powers.
In the autumn of 1944, Auzāns migrated to Germany with his family. In 1948 he settled in Great Britain.
Andrejs Auzāns died on March 23, 1953, in Stockport, Great Britain. He was buried in a local cemetery.

References 

1871 births
1953 deaths
People from Aizkraukle Municipality
People from Kreis Riga
Imperial Russian major generals
Latvian generals
Russian astronomers
Latvian Riflemen
Russian military personnel of the Russo-Japanese War
Russian military personnel of World War I
Soviet military personnel of the Russian Civil War
Recipients of the Order of St. George of the Fourth Degree
Recipients of the Order of St. Vladimir, 3rd class
Recipients of the Order of St. Vladimir, 4th class
Recipients of the Order of Saint Stanislaus (Russian), 2nd class
Recipients of the Order of Saint Stanislaus (Russian), 3rd class
Recipients of the Order of St. Anna, 2nd class
Recipients of the Order of St. Anna, 3rd class
Recipients of the Order of the Three Stars
Recipients of the Military Order of the Cross of the Eagle, Class II
Latvian World War II refugees
Latvian expatriates in Germany
Latvian emigrants to the United Kingdom